Lomandra filiformis, commonly known as wattle mat-rush, is a tussock forming perennial herb that is native to Australia.  It is sparsely tufted, with strap-like leaves and yellow flowers.  It grows in dry sclerophyll forest and grassy woodland, usually on well-drained rocky or sandy soils.

References

filiformis
Asparagales of Australia
Flora of Queensland
Flora of New South Wales
Flora of Victoria (Australia)
Plants described in 1808